Stefanie Schaeffer (born Stefani Lynn Schaeffer; May 31, 1974) is an American defense attorney and television presenter from California. She was the winner of The Apprentice: Los Angeles, the sixth season of the reality show The Apprentice. She is currently the host of Know Your Rights TV, a news and legal webisodic.

Early life and education
Schaeffer was born in Burbank, California to Gloria Peri-Smith and Peter Schaeffer, and was raised in Palm Springs. She has one brother, Michael Schaeffer.

She had a double major in college - English and psychology - and graduated from the University of California, Riverside. Schaeffer graduated from Southwestern University School of Law in their SCALE program.

Career
Selected as a Los Angeles Lawyer "Young Rising Star" in 2006 for excellence in law, Schaeffer was a trial attorney for California defense firm Stockwell, Harris, Widom, Woolverton & Muehl.

She joined the firm on August 16, 2006, prior to The Apprentice. She defended California employers against workers' compensation, subrogation and discrimination claims, and defended large real estate developers in construction defect litigation. She worked for Goldman, Magdalin & Krikes, LLP.

She is a member of the alumni association board of directors at Southwestern Law School.

The Apprentice
Schaeffer was hired in the sixth season of The Apprentice. Schaeffer is the first practicing attorney (season-two winner Kelly Perdew graduated from law school but chose not to practice) and the second woman to be hired by Trump. Schaeffer oversaw the Trump at Cap Cana project in Santo Domingo on a 1-year contract (with a starting salary exceeding US$250,000) as an owners' representative for Trump at Capcana, and also became the Vice President of sales and marketing for Trump International Hotel and Tower in Las Vegas.

Filmography

Personal life
Schaeffer lives in Los Angeles, California.

References

External links

The NBC Apprentice Season 6 Bio

1974 births
American women business executives
American business executives
California lawyers
American women lawyers
Living people
People from Burbank, California
University of California, Riverside alumni
Southwestern Law School alumni
The Trump Organization employees
21st-century American businesspeople
Trial lawyers
The Apprentice (franchise) winners
Participants in American reality television series
21st-century American businesswomen